The United States District Court for the Western District of Michigan (in case citations, W.D. Mich.) is the federal district court with jurisdiction over of the western portion of the state of Michigan, including the entire Upper Peninsula and the Lower Peninsula from Lansing westward.

Appeals from the Western District of Michigan are taken to the United States Court of Appeals for the Sixth Circuit (except for patent claims and claims against the U.S. government under the Tucker Act, which are appealed to the Federal Circuit).

, the United States Attorney for the Western District of Michigan is Mark Totten.

History 

The United States District Court for the District of Michigan was established on July 1, 1836, by 5 Stat. 61, with a single judgeship. The district court was not assigned to a judicial circuit, but was granted the same jurisdiction as United States circuit courts, except in appeals and writs of error, which were the jurisdiction of the Supreme Court. Due to the Toledo War, a boundary dispute with Ohio, Michigan did not become a state of the union until January 26, 1837. On March 3, 1837, Congress passed an act that repealed the circuit court jurisdiction of the U.S. District Court for the District of Michigan, assigned the District of Michigan to the Seventh Circuit, and established a U.S. circuit court for the district, 5 Stat. 176.

On July 15, 1862, Congress reorganized the circuits and assigned Michigan to the Eighth Circuit by 12 Stat. 576, and on January 28, 1863, the Congress again reorganized Seventh and Eight Circuits and assigned Michigan to the Seventh Circuit, by 12 Stat. 637. On February 24, 1863, Congress divided the District of Michigan into the Eastern and the Western districts, with one judgeship authorized for each district, by 12 Stat. 660. The Western District was later further divided into a Southern Division and a Northern Division.

In the Northern Division, Court was held at the Old Federal Building in Sault Ste. Marie from 1912 until 1941. While the law allows court to be held in Sault Ste. Marie, it no longer is.

Jurisdiction 
The District Court is based in Grand Rapids, courthouses also located in Kalamazoo, Lansing, and Marquette in the Upper Peninsula. The United States Court of Appeals for the Sixth Circuit has appellate jurisdiction over the court.

Divisions 
The Western District comprises two divisions.

Northern Division 
The Northern Division comprises the counties of Alger, Baraga, Chippewa, Delta, Dickinson, Gogebic, Houghton, Iron, Keweenaw, Luce, Mackinac, Marquette, Menominee, Ontonagon, and Schoolcraft.

Court for the Northern Division can be held in Marquette and Sault Sainte Marie.

Southern Division 
The Southern Division comprises the counties of Allegan, Antrim, Barry, Benzie, Berrien, Branch, Calhoun, Cass, Charlevoix, Clinton, Eaton, Emmet, Grand Traverse, Hillsdale, Ingham, Ionia, Kalamazoo, Kalkaska, Kent, Lake, Leelanau, Manistee, Mason, Mecosta, Missaukee, Montcalm, Muskegon, Newaygo, Oceana, Osceola, Ottawa, Saint Joseph, Van Buren, and Wexford.

Court for the Southern Division can be held in Grand Rapids, Kalamazoo, Lansing, and Traverse City.

Notable cases 
Some of the notable cases that have come before the United States District Court for the Western District of Michigan include:
 Bogaert v. Land
 Brown v. Davenport
 Carroll v. United States
 Lehnert v. Ferris Faculty Ass'n
 Newberry v. United States
 Upjohn Co. v. United States
 United States v. Bestfoods
 United States v. Craft

Current judges 
:

Former judges

Chief judges

Succession of seats

See also 
 Courts of Michigan
 List of current United States district judges
 List of United States federal courthouses in Michigan

References

External links 
 United States District Court for the Western District of Michigan Official Website
 United States Attorney for the Western District of Michigan Official Website

Michigan
Michigan law
Grand Rapids, Michigan
Kalamazoo, Michigan
Lansing, Michigan
Marquette County, Michigan
1863 establishments in Michigan
Courthouses in Michigan
Courts and tribunals established in 1863